Polychaos is an amoeboid genus in the Amoebozoa group.  Several characters unite the species in this genus.  The pseudopods meld at their bases when the organism is moving, and have dorsal, longitudinal ridges.  The nucleus is oval or ellipsoid.

Classification 
Polychaos includes the following species:
 Polychaos annulatum (Pénard 1902) Smirnov & Goodkov 1998
 Polychaos dubium (Schaeffer, 1916) Schaeffer 1926
 Polychaos fasciculatum (Penard, 1902) Schaeffer 1926
 Polychaos nitidubium Bovee, 1970
 Polychaos timidum Bovee, 1972

Phylogenetic analysis has shown this that genus belongs to the family Hartmannellidae.

References

Amoebozoa genera